Andrzej Marian Kącki (born 29 November 1953) is a former Polish handball player who competed in the 1980 Summer Olympics.

External links
Profile 

1953 births
Living people
Sportspeople from Tarnów
Polish male handball players
Handball players at the 1980 Summer Olympics
Olympic handball players of Poland
20th-century Polish people